Luke (full name in the television series: Luke Abrams) is a fictional character from the comic book series The Walking Dead and the television series of the same name, where he is portrayed by Dan Fogler.

Comic book series
Luke was part of Magna's group who joins the Alexandria Safe-Zone Community two years after the Savior war ends. Luke is shown to be very supportive of Magna being the leader of their group; when Rick asks Magna who the leader is, Magna tries to tell him that there is no leader and surviving was a team effort, but Luke interrupts her and tells Rick that Magna is the leader. Along with eleven other people he was decapitated by Alpha during the Whisperer conflict.

Television series

Season 9
In the episode "What Comes After", a small group of survivors, Magna, Connie, Kelly, Yumiko, and Luke are trying to hold off a walker horde when a few are shot from a forest nearby. The group is told to take cover, and find that they have been rescued by a now-preteen Judith Grimes who wears Carl's hat and is armed with Rick's revolver and a katana like Michonne. In the episode "Who Are You Now?", Luke and the others arrive in Alexandria and speak to the council, but Michonne instead escorts them to Hilltop. In the episode "Stradivarius", Luke, a former music teacher, recovers a supply of musical instruments he has collected and had stashed there. During the night, Luke scavenges from junk in the abandoned building, alerting Michonne, and when he emerges with an object, she slashes it in two. He reveals that the object was a rare Stradivarius violin, one he had found earlier in their group's travels and states that he believes that by bringing art and music back, they will be able to overcome the walkers. In the mid-season finale "Evolution", Luke and the group arrive at Hilltop.

In the mid-season premiere "Adaptation", Tara, Alden, and others planned out search parties to look for the group, with Alden and Luke heading out on the rescue mission. After Alden and Luke find arrows from Yumiko embedded in trees, they follow the arrows. However, the arrows draw them directly into a dense part of a forest where humans in walker masks surround them. One of the humans reveals the arrow trail was set up by them, brandishes a sawed-off shotgun at them, and proclaims: "Trail ends here." In the episode "Bounty", a couple of Whisperers bring up a tied up Alden and Luke. Alpha then offers to trade both of them for her daughter; Daryl accepts. As the standoff continues, the baby belonging to one of disguised women starts to cry, drawing the walkers. Alpha shrugs at the mother, indicating that she should leave the baby to die. Fearing for her life, the baby's mother decides to abandon him as he continues to cry. Alden and Luke beg for Alpha to have the baby be spared, but Alpha refuses. The Hilltop guards bang the fence to attract the walkers away from the baby, but it doesn't work. Luke then signs Connie, still hiding in the cornfield, to grab the baby. Lydia opts to leave on her own accord and is traded for Alden and Luke. In the episode "The Calm Before", Luke performs music on stage with Alden.

Season 10
In the season premiere "Lines We Cross", Luke helps form a militia and meets Jules from Oceanside. In the episode "Silence the Whisperers", as proper repairs on the fence at Hilltop start, there are reports of a Whisperer near Oceanside. Michonne heads there with Judith and Luke, with Eugene staying behind to help with repairs. In the first part finale "The World Before", Michonne, Judith, and Luke travel to Oceanside. Along the way, they visit a library for books and music. While looking at music sheets, Luke is attacked by walkers from among the bookshelves. He is rescued by an unknown person who then runs away. When they arrive at Oceanside, a man named Virgil is captured and Michonne threatens him with death if he doesn't explain himself. Luke recognizes him as the one who saved him in the library. Before he can explain, the group is attacked by walkers. Judith and Luke later return to Alexandria.

In the episode "Morning Star", Luke is in Hilltop when a horde of walkers approaches. In the episode "Walk with Us", Luke is injured and unconscious when Hilltop is destroyed. In the episode "The Tower", Luke is among the people relocated to an abandoned hospital. In the second part finale "A Certain Doom", Daryl, Carol, Jerry, Magna, Luke, Kelly, Beatrice, and Jules decide to venture through the horde covered in walker guts to engineer the escape plan. The survivors set up Luke's sound system and begin playing Talking Heads' "Burning Down the House" on repeat, successfully luring the horde away from the Tower, and giving the people inside an opportunity to escape. When the Whisperers destroy Luke's sound system, the group infiltrates the horde and assassinates the Whisperers one by one, allowing Carol and Lydia to lead the horde to its doom. Following the conclusion of the war, Luke moves to Oceanside to be with Jules.

Season 11
After being absent for most of the season, Luke returns in "Faith" where Luke and Jules encounter Aaron, Elijah, Lydia and Jerry as they are on their way to Oceanside. Luke and Jules reveal that Oceanside has been taken over by Commonwealth forces, having only escaped as they had been away on a scavenging mission when the invasion started. With Commonwealth soldiers searching the area, Lydia has the group cover themselves in walker guts so as to hide amongst a nearby herd. However, the soldiers begin leading the herd towards the Commonwealth.

In "Family," the group continues to move with the herd as it is merged with two other herds into one massive herd of thousands. They attempt to break away into an abandoned RV, but Luke, Jules and Elijah are swept away from the others and Lydia is bitten in the arm. As the herd begins to overrun the Commonwealth, Luke and Jules emerge from it, having managed to blend in long enough to get to the Commonwealth. Luke is reunited with his friends for the first time in months and the two join the others in fighting the herd.

In "Rest in Peace," Jules is devoured by the herd and Luke is bitten in the leg while trying to save her. Luke's friends rush him to the Commonwealth's abandoned hospital where they desperately amputate his leg. However, it doesn't work and Luke succumbs to blood loss shortly thereafter surrounded by Magna, Kelly, Connie and Yumiko. After Luke dies, Magna tearfully stabs him in the head to keep Luke from reanimating and his body is covered with a sheet before everyone is forced to flee as the hospital is overrun.

A year later, Luke and Jules' names are on a memorial plaque that Eugene visits, grouped together with Rosita's name, Rosita having died after being bitten in the shoulder during the invasion shortly after Luke's death. The plaque reveals that Luke's full name is Luke Abrams.

Development and reception
Dan Fogler was cast as Luke, a former music teacher who has come to appreciate safety in numbers.

References

The Walking Dead (franchise) characters